The National Institute of Open Schooling (NIOS), formerly National Open School (name changed in 2002), is the board of education under the Union Government of India. It was established by the Ministry of Human Resource Development of the Government of India in 1989 to provide education to all segments of society under the motive to increase literacy and aimed forward for flexible learning. The NIOS is a national board that administers examinations for Secondary and Senior Secondary examinations similar to the CBSE and the CISCE. It also offers vocational courses after the high school.

NIOS had a cumulative enrollment of about 1.5 million students from 2004 to 2009 at secondary and senior secondary levels and enrolls about 350,000 students annually which makes it the largest open schooling system in the world.

International collaboration and overseas centres
The NIOS collaborates with the Commonwealth of Learning (COL) and UNESCO. It also has study centres for Indian expatriates in the Bahrain, United Arab Emirates, Oman, Kuwait, Nepal, Canada, Kingdom of Saudi Arabia, Australia, United Kingdom, New Zealand, Malaysia, Singapore and the United States of America.

Courses offered

NIOS offer the following courses:
 Open Basic Education (OBE) Programme for 14+ years age group, adolescents and adults at A, B and C levels that are equivalent to classes III, V and VIII of the formal school system
 Secondary Course—Equivalent to class X
 Senior Secondary Course—Equivalent to class XII 
 Vocational Education Courses
 Life enrichment programmes
 D.EL.ED. course
 Secondary and Senior Secondary Course For ITI Student

Examinations
The public examinations are held twice a year in April–May and October–November on dates fixed by the NIOS. However, one  also eligible to appear through the On-Demand Examinations at  Level and Senior Secondary level in those subjects only in which candidates have taken admission in NIOS for subject wise learning.
Results of the public examinations are announced usually six weeks after the last date of examinations.

Regional offices of the board

See also
 Indira Gandhi National Open University (IGNOU)
 Board of High School and Intermediate Education Uttar Pradesh (UP Board), India
 Central Board of Secondary Education (CBSE), India
 Council for the Indian School Certificate Examinations (CISCE), India (ICSE and ISC examinations are conducted by CISCE )
 Indian School Certificate (ISC), India
 Indian Certificate of Secondary Education (ICSE), India
 Secondary School Leaving Certificate (SSLC)
 West Bengal Board of Secondary Education (WBBSE), India
 Board of Secondary Education, Madhya Pradesh (MPBSE), India
 Maharashtra State Board of Secondary and Higher Secondary Education (MSBSHSE), India
Telangana Open School Admission 2021-22

References

External links
 
 Telangana Open School Admission Notification

School qualifications
Distance education in India
School boards in India
Educational testing and assessment organizations
High school course levels
Ministry of Education (India)
1989 establishments in Uttar Pradesh
Indian educational websites